The Western Australian Individual Speedway Championship is a Motorcycle speedway championship held annually in Western Australia to determine the WA State champion. The event is organised by the Speedway Motorcycle Club of WA and is sanctioned by Motorcycling Australia (MA).

Mick McKeon and former twice Australian Champion Glenn Doyle have both won six championships each. Chum Taylor, who won his first championship in 1958 at Perth's Claremont Speedway, is next with five wins, his last in 1970.

Seven international riders have become the Western Australian Champion. They are Arthur Atkinson (England - 1930), Wal Morton (England - 1936), Ken McKinlay (Scotland - 1966), Ove Fundin (Sweden - 1969), Ivan Mauger (New Zealand - 1973), Simon Cross (England - 1987) and Rob Woffinden (England - 1988). Although 1956 winner Ron Johnson was born in Scotland, he emigrated to Perth with his family when still a child and started his speedway career at Claremont. He also rode for Australia during his career.

Winners since 1927/28
Unless stated, all riders are from Western Australia

References

External links
Honor Roll since 1927/28

Motorsport competitions in Australia
Speedway in Australia
Speedway